The UCI Junior Track Cycling World Championships (named the UCI Juniors Track World Championships before 2016) are a set of world championship events for junior riders, for various disciplines and distances in track cycling and are regulated by the Union Cycliste Internationale (UCI). In the period 2005–2009 the championships were part of the UCI Junior World Championships.

Current events include: time trial, keirin, individual pursuit, team pursuit, points race, scratch race, sprint, team sprint, omnium and, for men only, madison.  Women's events are shorter than men's. Championships are open to riders selected by their respective national cycling associations. They compete in the colours of their country.

The UCI awards a gold medal and a rainbow jersey to the winner and silver and bronze medals to the second and third place-getters. World champions wear their rainbow jerseys until the following year's championship, but they may wear it only in the type of event in which they won it. Former champions can wear rainbow cuffs on their everyday jerseys. World track championships are allocated to different countries each year. They are run by that country's national cycling association, although the judges are provided by the UCI.

Summary
Source:

Results
 https://www.the-sports.org/track-cycling-world-junior-championships-1975-medals-epa41991.html
 https://www.the-sports.org/track-cycling-world-junior-championships-1976-medals-epa41992.html
 https://www.the-sports.org/track-cycling-world-junior-championships-1977-medals-epa41993.html
 https://www.the-sports.org/track-cycling-world-junior-championships-1978-medals-epa41994.html
 https://www.the-sports.org/track-cycling-world-junior-championships-1979-medals-epa41995.html
 https://www.the-sports.org/track-cycling-world-junior-championships-1980-medals-epa41996.html
 https://www.the-sports.org/track-cycling-world-junior-championships-1981-medals-epa41997.html
 https://www.the-sports.org/track-cycling-world-junior-championships-1982-medals-epa41998.html
 https://www.the-sports.org/track-cycling-world-junior-championships-1983-medals-epa41999.html
 https://www.the-sports.org/track-cycling-world-junior-championships-1984-medals-epa42000.html
 https://www.the-sports.org/track-cycling-world-junior-championships-1985-medals-epa42001.html
 https://www.the-sports.org/track-cycling-world-junior-championships-1986-medals-epa42002.html
 https://www.the-sports.org/track-cycling-world-junior-championships-1987-medals-epa42003.html
 https://www.the-sports.org/track-cycling-world-junior-championships-1988-medals-epa42004.html
 https://www.the-sports.org/track-cycling-world-junior-championships-1989-medals-epa42005.html
 https://www.the-sports.org/track-cycling-world-junior-championships-1990-medals-epa42006.html
 https://www.the-sports.org/track-cycling-world-junior-championships-1991-medals-epa42007.html
 https://www.the-sports.org/track-cycling-world-junior-championships-1992-medals-epa42008.html
 https://www.the-sports.org/track-cycling-world-junior-championships-1993-medals-epa42009.html
 https://www.the-sports.org/track-cycling-world-junior-championships-1994-medals-epa42010.html
 https://www.the-sports.org/track-cycling-world-junior-championships-1995-medals-epa42011.html
 https://www.the-sports.org/track-cycling-world-junior-championships-1996-medals-epa42012.html
 https://www.the-sports.org/track-cycling-world-junior-championships-1997-medals-epa42013.html
 https://www.the-sports.org/track-cycling-world-junior-championships-1998-medals-epa42014.html
 https://www.the-sports.org/track-cycling-world-junior-championships-1999-medals-epa42015.html
 https://www.the-sports.org/track-cycling-world-junior-championships-2000-medals-epa42016.html
 https://www.the-sports.org/track-cycling-world-junior-championships-2001-medals-epa41980.html
 https://www.the-sports.org/track-cycling-world-junior-championships-2002-medals-epa41979.html
 https://www.the-sports.org/track-cycling-world-junior-championships-2003-medals-epa41978.html
 https://www.the-sports.org/track-cycling-world-junior-championships-2004-medals-epa41977.html
 https://www.the-sports.org/track-cycling-world-junior-championships-2005-medals-epa41976.html
 https://www.the-sports.org/track-cycling-world-junior-championships-2006-medals-epa41975.html
 https://www.the-sports.org/track-cycling-world-junior-championships-2007-medals-epa41974.html
 https://www.the-sports.org/track-cycling-world-junior-championships-2008-medals-epa41973.html
 https://www.the-sports.org/track-cycling-world-junior-championships-2009-medals-epa41972.html
 https://www.the-sports.org/track-cycling-world-junior-championships-2010-medals-epa41971.html
 https://www.the-sports.org/track-cycling-world-junior-championships-2011-medals-epa32599.html
 https://www.the-sports.org/track-cycling-world-junior-championships-2012-medals-epa37978.html
 https://www.the-sports.org/track-cycling-world-junior-championships-2013-medals-epa38930.html
 https://www.the-sports.org/track-cycling-world-junior-championships-2014-medals-epa56344.html
 https://www.the-sports.org/track-cycling-world-junior-championships-2015-medals-epa62538.html
 https://www.the-sports.org/track-cycling-world-junior-championships-2016-medals-epa70991.html
 https://www.the-sports.org/track-cycling-world-junior-championships-2017-medals-epa80376.html
 https://www.the-sports.org/track-cycling-world-junior-championships-2018-medals-epa85607.html
 https://www.the-sports.org/track-cycling-world-junior-championships-2019-medals-epa96003.html
 https://www.the-sports.org/track-cycling-world-junior-championships-2021-medals-epa113534.html

See also

 UCI Juniors World Championships
 UCI Track Cycling World Ranking
 UCI Track Cycling World Cup Classics
 UCI Track Cycling World Championships
 UCI Para-cycling Track World Championships

References

 
Junior
Track cycling races